Ultrasonic algae control is a commercial technology that has been claimed to control the blooming of cyanobacteria, algae, and biofouling in lakes, and reservoirs, by using pulsed ultrasound. The duration of such treatment is supposed to take up to several months, depending on the water volume and algae species. Despite the experimental demonstration of certain bioeffects in small samples under controlled laboratory and sonication conditions, there is no scientific foundation for outdoors ultrasonic algae control.

Academic studies

It has been speculated that ultrasound produced at the resonance frequencies of cells or their membranes may cause them to rupture. 
The center frequencies of the ultrasound pulses used in academic studies lie between 20 kHz and 2.5 MHz. The acoustic powers, pressures, and intensities applied vary from low, not affecting humans,

to high, unsafe for swimmers.

According to research at the University of Hull, ultrasound-assisted gas release from blue-green algae cells may take place from nitrogen-containing cells, but only under very specific short-distance conditions, which are not representative for intended outdoors applications. In addition, a study by Wageningen University on several algae species concluded that most claims on outdoors ultrasonic algae control are unsubstantiated.

See also
 Ultrasonic antifouling

References

Green algae

Ultrasound
Acoustics
Algae classes